Donzell Young (March 31, 1939 – July 16, 2006) was an American football coach and college athletics administrator.  He seed two stints as the head football coach at the University of Arkansas at Pine Bluff, from 1973 to 1975 and again from 1984 to 1986, compiling a record of 10–45–2.

Head coaching record

See also
 List of college football head coaches with non-consecutive tenure

References

1939 births
2006 deaths
Arkansas–Pine Bluff Golden Lions athletic directors
Arkansas–Pine Bluff Golden Lions football coaches